"Shout" is a popular song, written and originally recorded by American vocal group the Isley Brothers in 1959. Later versions include a UK Top 10 hit in 1964 by Scottish singer Lulu.

"Shout" was inducted to the Grammy Hall of Fame in 1999. Rolling Stone magazine ranked it at number 119 on its list of "The 500 Greatest Songs of All Time".

The Isley Brothers 
In performances around 1958, the Isley Brothers would typically end their shows with a cover version of Jackie Wilson's hit "Lonely Teardrops".  At one performance at the Uptown Theater in Philadelphia, lead singer Ronald Isley could see the audience standing and yelling their approval, so he extended the song by improvising a call-and-response around the words "You know you make me wanna..." "Shout!".    The group developed the song further in later performances and rehearsals, using a drawn out "We-eee-ll" copied from Ray Charles' "I Got a Woman".  On returning to New York City at the end of their engagement, they suggested to record producers Hugo & Luigi that they record the "Shout!" climax of the performance as a separate song. The producers agreed and suggested that the band invite friends to the recording studio to generate a party atmosphere.

The recording took place on July 29, 1959, with Hugo and Luigi choosing the studio musicians and the Isley Brothers inviting organist Herman Stephens.  Released in August 1959, with the song split over both sides of the record, the single reached number 47 on the Billboard Hot 100, becoming the group's first chart hit, and later the brothers' first gold single on the basis of its longevity.  Ronald Isley later said that church groups wrote to radio stations asking them to stop playing the record, because of its use of a traditional black gospel sound.

Other recordings 

One month after the initial release, Johnny O'Keefe performed the song on his Australian TV show Six O'Clock Rock. He released it as a single, which reached number 2 in Australia. His 1964 re-recording was only a minor hit at number 49. Joey Dee and the Starliters reached number 6 with their recording of the song in 1962. It begins with Joey Dee quietly speaking his suggestion to do a little bit of "Shout" before he begins singing, in which the group only covers the first part of the song, omitting the "Say you will" portions as well. They also reworked the chorus portion of the song into an even bigger hit, "Peppermint Twist", while the Isley Brothers' version re-charted that same year at number 94.

In 1964, in the U.K., a version by Scottish pop singer Lulu reached number 7 (attributed to Lulu and the Luvvers). She re-recorded the song in 1986, and it reached number 8. The Shangri-Las included a version of the song in their debut LP Leader of the Pack in 1965. Tommy James and the Shondells recorded a version of the song on their 1967 album, I Think We're Alone Now.

The song was famously performed in its entirety, by Lloyd G. Williams (credited as Otis Day and the Knights), for the 1978 hit movie National Lampoon's Animal House during the frat house toga party sequence.

The Beatles recorded "Shout" in 1964 for a television special called Around the Beatles. The recording was later released in 1996 on the Beatles archival album, Anthology 1.

The National Football League (NFL)'s Buffalo Bills commissioned a version of "Shout" in 1987 with modified lyrics sung by jingle writer Scott Kemper. It has served as the team's official fight song ever since, except for a brief period in 1993 when Polaroid's worldwide licensing of the song led to a dispute over royalties, during which the team used a version of "Shout! Shout! (Knock Yourself Out)" by Ernie Maresca.

The song was prominently featured in Elvira: Mistress of the Dark, but they could not afford to license the original recording, so it was covered by Larry Wright.

Polaroid used a version of the song, retitled "Shoot", in a 1990s-era ad campaign.

A recording of the song was used for the soundtrack of the movie Sister Act in 1992.

Louchie Lou & Michie One recorded a ragga/rap version of the song, titled "Shout (It Out)", which reached number 7 on the UK chart in 1993.

The original 1959 recording was featured in the 1982 film Diner, and the Cheers season 4 episode "Suspicion".

Michael Jackson used the hook of "Shout" in 2001 for the song of the same title, which was the B-side to the UK single of "Cry" from the Invincible album.

See also 
 "Shout and Shimmy"

References

External links 
  List of recorded versions, SecondhandSongs.com

1959 songs
1959 singles
1962 singles
1975 singles
Songs written by O'Kelly Isley Jr.
Songs written by Ronald Isley
Songs written by Rudolph Isley
The Isley Brothers songs
Lulu (singer) songs
Tommy James and the Shondells songs
The Shangri-Las songs
Song recordings produced by Hugo & Luigi
Grammy Hall of Fame Award recipients
RCA Records singles
American rock-and-roll songs
Buffalo Bills
National Football League fight songs
Gospel songs